This is the discography of American rapper Yukmouth.

Albums

Studio albums

Collaboration albums
 Operation Stackola with Luniz (1995)
 Bootlegs & B-Sides with Luniz (1997)
 Lunitik Muzik with Luniz (1997)
 Block Shit with Tha Gamblaz (2001)
 Silver & Black with Luniz (2002)
 In Thugz We Trust with Thug Lordz (2004)
 Killa Thugs with Killa Klump (2006)
 100 Racks with Messy Marv (2006)
 Thug Lordz Trilogy with Thug Lordz (2006)
 I'm Good with Killa Klump (2006)
 Yukmouth Presents I-Rocc "The Center of Attention" with I-Rocc (2006)
 Thug Money with Thug Lordz (2010)
 The Cream Team with Chino Nino & P Hustle (2013)
 The Last Dragon with The Regime (2013)
 Dragon Gang with The Regime (2013)
 High Timez with Luniz (2015)
 Dragon Dynasty with The Dragon (2014)
 No Pressure with Luniz (2018)
 Savages with J-Hood (2018)
 Double Dragon with The Gatlin (2019)
 Money Rich Regime with California Brougham (2021)

Compilation albums
United Ghettos of America (2002)
United Ghettos of America Vol. 2 (2004)
Yukmouth Presents West Coast Gangsta V.15 (2005)
United Ghettos of America: Eye Candy (2007)
Greatest Hits (2008)
18k The Golden Era (2013)

Mixtapes
All Out War Vol.1 with The Regime (2005)
All Out War Vol.2 with The Regime (2005)
How Da West Luv 50 (2005)
In Thugs We Trust -Tha Mix Tape- with Thug Lordz (2005)
All Out War Vol.3 with The Regime (2006)
Million Dollar Mixtape (2006)
The City of Dope, Vol. 1 (2007)
Lord of War (2007)
City of Smoke (2007)
City of Smoke, Vol. 2 (2009)

Extended plays
Cookies 'n Cream with Blanco (2012)

Guest appearances

References

Hip hop discographies
Discographies of American artists